= Constituency NM-364 =

Former constituency of the Punjabi Provincial Legislature, Pakistan

W-364
- Minority Reserved constituency for the Provincial Assembly of Punjab

Current constituency

NM-364 is a Minority reserved Constituency in the Provincial Assembly of Punjab.

== See also ==
- Punjab, Pakistan
